John William Smith (November 4, 1792 – January 12, 1845) was a Republic of Texas and American political figure, the first mayor of San Antonio under the Republic, and the first mayor of San Antonio under the state of Texas. He supported and served Texas during the struggle for Texas Independence.

Early life
Born William John Smith in Virginia) as the second son of John and Isabel Smith, he grew up in Ralls County, Missouri after moving from his birth state of Virginia, and received an expensive education. He married Harriet Stone in Hannibal, Missouri sometime between 1821 and 1822. They had three known children, Samuel, Mary Elizabeth and Lucinda.

His first elected position was in 1822 as Sheriff of Ralls County and State and County tax Collector. He resigned from the post in 1826 to move to Texas following the birth of his third child. His wife refused to accompany him and filed for divorce. She ultimately came to Texas with her second husband.

Move to San Antonio
Smith moved to Mexican Texas and settled in San Antonio. In Texas, he changed his first and middle names around because "William" was difficult for Mexicans to pronounce. He was known throughout the town as "El Colorado", Spanish for "Redhead". He served as in the city as military storekeeper until 1835 also working as a surveyor (like his Texas contemporaries; James Kerr, Byrd Lockhart, and Arthur Swift ) and a civil engineer. While in the city (San Fernando Cathedral to be exact), he converted to Roman Catholicism and married a 15-year-old Spanish (her great grandfather Juan Curbelo came from the Canary Islands) girl named Maria Jesusita Curbelo.

Texas Revolution

Through time, Smith had become upset by the occupation of San Antonio by Mexican Colonel Domingo Ugartechea. He was arrested with A. C. Holmes and Samuel Maverick and was saved by his wife's pleas, which enabled him to escape and guide the final assault in the Siege of Bexar.

He served twice as a messenger during the Siege of the Alamo. On February 23, Smith and Sutherland were sent by Travis as scouts to assess the Mexican Army's strength and position. Upon locating the Mexican Army in strength, he immediately returned to the Alamo. That evening he was dispatched to Gonzales, Texas with a message from Travis. He returned to the Alamo from Gonzales, Texas on March 1. Before the final battle of the Alamo and its fall, William B. Travis sent Smith with a message for Washington-on-the-Brazos, allowing him to escape the fate that all Texas soldiers defending San Antonio ultimately succumbed to. After delivering the message, he returned with men to fight in the battle but heard no gunfire as their horses drank at Cibolo Creek. He was informed that the battle of the Alamo was over and headed eastward to fight at San Jacinto, where independence was won.

Mayor of San Antonio

He was elected Mayor on September 19, 1837, and served until 1838. As mayor, he prohibited public bathing in the San Antonio River and San Pedro Creek between the hours of 5 a.m. and 8 pm. He established that businesses must close at 9 p.m. on Sunday, and allowed for milk cows in Downtown as long as they were milked and in the corral before 10 pm. Smith also regulated dog ownership, taxing citizens $2.00 for bitches and $0.50 for males. Although he did not run for re-election in 1838, he would run in 1840 and was elected. He served his second time as mayor until 1844. During this time, he constructed the city's first bridge across the San Antonio River on Commerce Street.

He was for a time postmaster of San Antonio.

Other positions he held in Bexar County were alderman, tax assessor, clerk of the County Court, clerk of the Board of Land Commissioners, clerk of the County Probate Court, county treasurer.

Senator of the Republic
During the Republic years, Smith served as a commissioner, to treat with the Indians of Texas.

From 1842 to January 12, 1845, he served the Republic as a Texas Senator.

Death
He died on January 12, 1845, most likely from pneumonia. He is regarded as a hero and was honored as such upon his death.

He was buried at the Washington-on-the-Brazos State Historical Park, but his remains were later transferred to Washington Cemetery which is located on 19724 Washington Cemetery Rd, Washington, Texas in Washington County, where his body remains today.

References

External links
TAMU John William Smith
Daughters of the Republic of Texas John W. Smith records

 

1792 births
1845 deaths
Converts to Roman Catholicism
Mayors of San Antonio
Alamo survivors
Alamo defenders
People of the Texas Revolution
Republic of Texas Senators
19th-century American politicians